The 2019–20 IUPUI Jaguars men's basketball team represented Indiana University – Purdue University Indianapolis in the 2019–20 NCAA Division I men's basketball season. The Jaguars, led by interim head coach Byron Rimm II, played their home games at Indiana Farmers Coliseum in Indianapolis, Indiana as members of the Horizon League. They finished the season 7–25, 3–15 in Horizon League play to finish in last place. They lost in the first round of the Horizon League tournament to UIC.

Previous season
The Jaguars finished the 2018–19 season 16–17 overall, 8–10 in Horizon League play to finish in a three-way tie for sixth place. In the Horizon League tournament, they were defeated by top seeded Wright State in the quarterfinals. They received an invitation to the CIT, where they were defeated by Marshall in the first round.

Offseason
In August 2019, Jason Gardner resigned as head basketball coach at IUPUI following an arrest for OWI in Indianapolis. Assistant coach Byron Rimm II was named interim head coach for the season. Rimm II then hired Brian Burton to round out the coaching staff for the season.

Roster

Schedule and results

|-
!colspan=12 style=| Exhibition

|-
!colspan=12 style=| Non-conference regular season

|-
!colspan=9 style=| Horizon League regular season

|-
!colspan=12 style=| Horizon League tournament
|-

|-

Source

References

IUPUI Jaguars men's basketball seasons
IUPUI Jaguars
IUPUI Jaguars men's basketball
IUPUI Jaguars men's basketball